Eugenio González Derbez (born September 2, 1961) is a Mexican actor and comedian. He has appeared in many films and television series including The Book of Life, The Angry Birds Movie 2 and The Secret Life of Pets.

In the 2010s, he appeared in many American films and television series, such as Jack and Jill, Girl in Progress, Rob!, and Miracles from Heaven. Apart from appearing in live-action roles, Derbez has appeared in animated films including. Derbez provided the Spanish dubs for many characters in the Spanish versions of American films including Dr. Dolittle, Mulan, 102 Dalmatians, and the Shrek franchise.

Derbez resides in Los Angeles, is married to Alessandra Rosaldo, and has 4 children.

Early life
Derbez was born and raised in Mexico City and expressed interest in acting at an early age, landing his first roles as extras in soap operas at age 12. He made his directing debut in 1997 with a Mexican soap opera named .

Career

1980s and 1990s

In 1988, he got his first recurring television position when he played a number of roles in a comedy show called . Derbez kept making movies during the 1990s. In 1992 he began hosting the variety show .

In 1997, Derbez made his directing debut in a soap opera named . In 1999 Derbez started a comedy show, . He also starred that year in } ('Accomplices to the Rescue'). In 2003 he produced a television series named XHDRBZ. He later produced  ('Countrymen Hospital'),  ('Neighbors'), and in 2009 .

Derbez is one of the few Mexican actors to have achieved international acclaim, earning international award recognition as well as starring in commercial American films.

Derbez has appeared in a number of successful and critically acclaimed films including , which won the Grand Jury Prize at Sundance in 2007 and his first non-comedy film, the indie smash hit  (released as Under the Same Moon in English) directed by Patricia Riggen, with Adrián Alonso and Kate del Castillo.

2000s
In 2002, Derbez and Florinda Meza co-created a sitcom named XHDRBZ, which marked his debut as a producer. Also in 2002, Derbez co-created, co-directed, and starred in the family sitcom , which gained Derbez further recognition amongst the Mexican and Latin community.

2010s
In 2011, Derbez starred in Adam Sandler's Jack and Jill as Felipe starring with Adam Sandler, Katie Holmes and Al Pacino; he also starred in Girl In Progress, with Eva Mendes, also directed by Patricia Riggen. Eugenio also starred in the CBS sitcom Rob! and on Broadway in Latinologues at the Helen Hayes Theater.

Derbez starred in Sony's Miracles from Heaven, with Jennifer Garner (directed by Patricia Riggen), and he voiced the role of Rico in the animated feature Underdogs, directed by Juan J. Campanella.

In 2013, Derbez starred in and directed Instructions Not Included the most successful Spanish-language film in the U.S. and worldwide, which broke numerous box office records, earning over $100 million. The Spanish-language comedy-drama became a surprise $44 million hit in the U.S., and the third highest-grossing film ($46 million) of the year in Mexico (only Despicable Me and Iron Man sequels did better).

In 2016, Derbez wrapped production on the Lionsgate/Pantelion feature How to Be a Latin Lover in which he starred with Salma Hayek, Rob Lowe, Kristen Bell, Raquel Welch, Rob Riggle, Linda Lavin and Rob Huebel. It was written by Chris Spain and Jon Zack and directed by Ken Marino. The film, produced by Derbez and his producing partner Ben Odell, was released in the U.S. on April 28, 2017, and May 5, 2017, in Mexico.

2020s
Derbez is a partner of 3pas Studios with producer Ben Odell. 

In 2021, via 3Pas Studios, he inked a first look deal with Univision, and he and Odell were executive producers on behalf of 3Pas Studios of the 2021 television series Acapulco, which stars Derbez. He appeared in the Academy Award-winning Apple TV+ film CODA, which won him, along with the rest of the cast, the Screen Actors Guild Award for Outstanding Performance by a Cast in a Motion Picture. In 2022 he started as the main character in the movie The Valet as Antonio Flores and will be participating in the movie based in the International best selling book Aristotle and Dante Discover the Secrets of The Universe.

Public image
Eugenio Derbez is one of Mexico's more successful comedic actors and directors. He was recognized by Variety in 2014 as the #1 most influential Latin American male in the world. On March 10, 2016, Derbez unveiled his star on Hollywood's Walk of Fame. The ceremony was attended by thousands of fans.

In 2014, following the success of Instructions Not Included, Derbez partnered with former Pantelion President of Production Benjamin Odell to create 3Pas Studios, his film production company in Los Angeles.

Personal life
Derbez was born in Mexico City, the son of actress Silvia Derbez and publicist Eugenio González Salas. Eugenio resides in Los Angeles with his family. Derbez is married to Alessandra Rosaldo, actress, model, and former Sentidos Opuestos singer. He is father to Mexican comedic actress Aislinn Derbez (her mother is Gabriela Michel), Mexican actor and singer Vadhir Derbez (his mother is Silvana Prince), Mexican actor José Eduardo Derbez (his mother is actress Victoria Ruffo) and Aitana Derbez (her mother is Alessandra Rosaldo). He is a vegetarian. He has a bulldog named Fiona.

Filmography

Films

Television

References

External links

 Eugenio Derbez bio (in Spanish)
 

1961 births
Mexican male film actors
Mexican male comedians
Mexican male television actors
Mexican television producers
Living people
Male actors from Mexico City
Comedians from Mexico City
20th-century Mexican male actors
20th-century American male actors
21st-century Mexican male actors
21st-century American male actors
Mexican people of French descent
Outstanding Performance by a Cast in a Motion Picture Screen Actors Guild Award winners